Ídolos rotos (Broken Idols) is a novel by the Venezuelan writer Manuel Díaz Rodríguez that was published in 1901. It is considered one of the most pessimistic novels written in Venezuela. It presents the social, political, and cultural life of people in Caracas with a defeatist attitude, where all hope of salvation has been abandoned. The central theme of the novel is the character Alberto Soria's failure in his effort to assert his ideals as an artist in Venezuela against a backdrop of the country's total decadence.

In the novel, different social problems are identified through the actions of well-defined characters: Alberto Soria, the misunderstood artist; Teresa Faria, the adulterous woman; General Galindo, the opportunist politician; and Emazábel, the social activist.

Structure 

The novel is divided into four parts and fifteen chapters.

The first part begins with the arrival of Alberto Soria who has been away in Paris for the past five years. His urgent return is motivated by the sudden illness of his father Don Pancho Soria. From the beginning of the novel, Alberto Soria is portrayed as being hypersensitive and behaving in an unhealthy and volatile manner. He has been uprooted from his country and out of touch with its problems. He had gone to Europe to study engineering, but once in Paris he abandoned his studies to become a sculptor. In his first contact with Caracas he is shocked by the environment. He feels maladjusted and out of place. He is bothered by the dirty streets and the poor architectural taste that predominates in the city. From his siblings Rosa and Pedro, he begins to realize the prevailing mediocrity and unhappiness that envelopes his ancestral home.

In the second part of the novel Alberto Soria's maladjustment to the Venezuelan environment increases. The process begins in his family when his father confesses his unhappiness at not having achieved his ambitions through his children. Next he finds out about the drama surrounding his sister Rosa who is married to Uribe, a man of low social status who is fond of games and deceit. He also notices the weak personality of his brother Pedro who acts according to the vagaries of politics. The climax of the crisis occurs when Alberto discovers that in Venezuela his status as an artist is questioned, which incites him to transform himself into a true creator, but he hesitates, assailed by fears and doubts. Little by little he isolates himself from others until he begins to associate only with nonconformists and intellectuals who think like himself and with whom he forms a reactionary bubble against the atmosphere of the times.

In the third part, the character shows an apparent change of conduct motivated by his love for María Almeida. Alberto intensifies his activity as a sculptor and finishes a Creole Venus that doesn't completely satisfy him. Despite that he stages an unsuccessful exhibition in a coffee shop near to the Plaza Bolívar in Caracas. Alberto Soria soon suffers an inexplicable change regarding the love that he feels for María Almeida and begins to experience strange mood swings due to unfounded jealousy, a product of his own mind. The third part of the novel ends with the death of his father.

The fourth part of the novel narrates the start and the evolution of the love between Alberto Soria and Teresa Farías, a strange and adulterous woman. Alberto begins to make a sculpture of his lover, but is soon discovered by his girlfriend and his sister. Soon a new civil war plunges the country in anarchy. After the triumph of the revolution the country falls in the hands of the populace and the military. Alberto goes to the School of Fine Arts, which has been turned into a barracks, and finds that his works have been mutilated and desecrated by the soldiers. At this point he gives up everything and decides to emigrate to safeguard his aesthetic ideals.

See also
Latin American literature
Venezuelan literature

Venezuelan novels
1901 novels
Novels set in Venezuela